Kenneth Sydney Fencott (born 27 December 1943), also known as Kenny Fencott, is an English former footballer who scored 13 goals from 76 appearances in the Football League playing as a forward for Aston Villa and Lincoln City. He went on to play non-league football for Tamworth.

After the rule allowing substitutions was introduced to the Football League in 1965, Fencott was named on the bench for the opening match of the 1965–66 season, but his services were not required; the first substitute used by the club was Roy Chapman in the second match of that season.

References

1943 births
Living people
Sportspeople from Walsall
English footballers
Association football forwards
Aston Villa F.C. players
Lincoln City F.C. players
Tamworth F.C. players
English Football League players